Romeo Elton (1817–1889) was an American academic and author.

Biography

Early life
Romeo Elton was born on February 2, 1817, in Burlington, Connecticut, where he grew up.

Career
He was a Professor of Latin and Greek Languages at Brown University in Providence, Rhode Island. He also served on the Board of Trustees of Brown University.

He wrote two books and co-wrote a third one. Together with Roger Williams, he wrote about the civic and religious affairs in colonial Rhode Island. On his own, he wrote about Roger Williams (1603–1683), an early Rhode Island Protestant pastor, and Jonathan Maxcy (1768–1820), the second President of Brown University.

He served as the Second Vice President of the Rhode Island Historical Society in 1837.

Personal life
He married Emeline Elton (1819–1906). They had two sons.

He died on May 24, 1889, at the age of seventy-two.

Legacy
The Elton Tavern in Burlington, Connecticut is named in his honor.

The Romeo Elton Professorship in Natural Theology is an endowed chair at Brown University also named in his honor. Richard Kimberly Heck held the professorship from 2009-2014. Since 2014 it has been held by John Tomasi who is a professor of political science, professor of philosophy by courtesy, and director of the Political Theory Project.

Bibliography
An Historical Discourse on the Civil and Religious Affairs of the Colony of Rhode-Island (with John Callender, Washington, D.C.: Library of Congress, 1838).
Life of Roger Williams: The Earliest Legislator and True Champion for a Full and Absolute Liberty of Conscience (Washington, D.C.: Library of Congress, 1842).
The Literary Remains of the Rev. J. Maxcy: With a Memoir of His Life (1844).

References

1817 births
1889 deaths
People from Burlington, Connecticut
Writers from Providence, Rhode Island
Brown University faculty